Statistics of Belgian First Division in the 1919–20 season.

Overview

It was contested by 12 teams, and FC Bruges won the championship: however, for reasons unknown, La Gantoise were not relegated to the Promotion Division.

League standings

Results

References

Belgian Pro League seasons
Belgian
Belgian First Division